Barbecue is a fictional character from the G.I. Joe: A Real American Hero toyline, comic books and animated series. He is the G.I. Joe Team's firefighter and debuted in 1985.

Profile
His real name is Gabriel A. Kelly, and his rank is that of corporal E-4. Barbecue was born in Boston, Massachusetts.

Barbecue's primary military specialty is fireman, and his secondary military specialty is infantry. Barbecue would have been the seventh Kelly in his family line in the Boston Fire department, if he hadn't joined the G.I. Joe Team. He does his job out of a sense of civic duty, not out of family loyalty. He also happens to like loud sirens, clanging bells, and breaking down doors with axes.

Barbecue is known off-duty as a party animal. His wild tendencies sometimes bring him into conflict with teammate Stalker, who doesn't believe that G.I. Joe is a place for partiers, regardless of whether it interferes with their performance on the G.I. Joe team. After the team was temporarily disbanded and reinstated, Barbecue offered his services once again, and was accepted back on reserve status for special missions.

He is shown to have dark blonde hair and a peach skin complexion when not wearing his helmet.

Toys
Barbecue was first released as an action figure in 1985. The figure was repainted and released as part of the Slaughter's Marauders line in 1989. A new version of Barbecue was released as part of the "Eco-Warriors" line in 1992.

New versions of Barbecue were released in 2008 for the G.I. Joe 25th Anniversary line, and in 2009 for the G.I. Joe: The Rise of Cobra line.

Comics

Marvel Comics
In the Marvel Comics G.I. Joe series, he first appeared in issue #40 (October 1985), crawling out of a storage locker on the Joe's new battle platform. His appearance is unexpected and earns him a pistol pointed in his face from Shipwreck. He is part of a team of Joes assigned to erect the new transportable Air-Sea Base in the Gulf of Mexico. When Cobra attacks, seeking to trigger the geological fault-line there, Barbecue helps protect the platform, by chopping off burning pieces, and leaping onto attacking hydrofoils. In the next issue, all available Joes are assigned to take down the newly formed Cobra Island. The island was created as a result of Cobra's efforts, and the Joes seek to drive Cobra off the island before they can claim sovereignty. Shipwreck and Barbecue take out a Cobra HISS tank by themselves. Legal maneuvering has Cobra Island recognized as a nation, and the Joes are forced to leave.

Barbecue later returns to the Gulf, as part of a team of Joes seeking to rescue Ripcord and Snake Eyes from Cobra Island. They take "Ripcord" back to the Pit, where they discover that this was really Zartan in disguise. After Zartan infiltrates Joe headquarters, Barbecue is seen spraying down the halls with foam, in hopes that the Joes will spot his footprints. Soon after, Barbecue helps take part in the assault on Springfield.

Barbecue is present when Storm Shadow infiltrates G.I. Joe HQ, in an effort to gain emotional support from Snake Eyes. When the Cobra agent is left to leave in peace, Barbecue makes a sarcastic comment about a second agent being allowed to leave with knowledge of the Joe HQ location (Zarana being the first in the previous issue). Scarlett, angered at the man's insensitivity, punches him in the face.

When murderous generals wish to push blame for a Cobra Island raid on the Joe team, he is one of the few Joes to escape capture. He teams up with the rogue Joes (such as Bazooka, Roadblock and Grunt), in a successful raid that rescues General Hawk, and ultimately exposes the conspiracy.

When Cobra later invades the Pit, Airtight and Barbecue fend off a squad of Laser Vipers. They retreat when the B.A.T.s are deployed, which break through the blast doors and prepare to invade the Pit.

Action Force
Barbecue also appears in the British Action Force comics, which maintain a different continuity. In Action Force continuity Barbecue is named Gabriel A. Garibaldi and was born in Naples, Italy. In the first issue, he mysteriously escapes being murdered at the hands of Storm Shadow. He later returns to help raid a Cobra stronghold that is masquerading as a fast food franchise. He also assists when Lady Jaye is threatened by a motion sensitive bomb. Airtight and Barbecue successfully stop a run-away train full of radioactive materials from causing the death of many innocent people. At the end of the story, Airtight refers to his friend as "Italian".

Devil's Due
Barbecue appears in issue #29 of the Devil's Due G.I. Joe series.

He is prominent in the alternate continuity of 'G.I.Joe Vs. Transformers'. He is part of a team sent to a future Earth in order to stop all of humanity from being wiped out. This involves working with Cobra operatives and ignoring allies.

IDW
Barbecue appears in the new continuity created by IDW. He and a team of Joes investigate a theater in the abandoned town of Springfield. A Cobra operative named Krake ambushes the team and kills every single member, including Barbecue. This kicks off the "contest" to find the next Cobra Commander by seeing who can kill the most Joes.

Animated series

Sunbow
Barbecue first appeared in the G.I. Joe first-season episode "The Further Adventures of G.I. Joe". In the Sunbow series, he speaks with a heavy New England accent and was voiced by Loren Lester. Early on in the series, Barbecue had blond hair, but in his later appearances his hair was recolored to reddish-brown. 

His first major role was in the episode "The Viper Is Coming", in which he first hosts a party at his newly renovated firehouse. He then constantly receives telephone calls from a mysterious man called the "Viper" telling him he is coming and giving ambiguous locations. The cryptic messages lead to G.I. Joe coincidentally finding and preemptively attacking Cobra at the various given locations. At the end of the episode, the Viper is revealed to be a German man who has come to wipe the windows of Barbecue's house.

The two-part episode "Captives of Cobra" reveals that Barbecue comes from a family of firefighters. In the same episode, his father is one of many Joe relatives brainwashed and sent to fight the team.

In another two-part episode, "Worlds Without End", he is one of the Joes sent to an alternate reality where Cobra rules the world.

He appeared in two PSAs, both of which involved fire safety.

G.I. Joe: The Movie
Barbecue also appeared briefly in the 1987 animated film G.I. Joe: The Movie, seen participating in the battle of Cobra-La.

DiC
He appeared in the DiC G.I. Joe cartoon four times, but had no spoken lines (just one grunt provided by Lee Jeffrey).

Renegades
Barbecue appears in the G.I. Joe: Renegades episode "Fire Fight". Gabriel Kelly is a firefighter who worked for the Green Ridge Fire Department, at the time when Cobra Industries was constructing a dam. He is initially against the anti-Cobra protests. Kelly helps put down a fire near the town mayor's house, thinking the Joes are the culprits. After learning Firefly is the real arsonist, he ends up assisting Roadblock in blowing up a dam in order to put out a fire that Firefly started. Roadblock gives him the nickname "Barbecue", which he likes. When Firefly ambushes Barbecue and Roadblock in the helicopter, Barbecue fights Firefly, until Roadblock gets him out of the helicopter. When offered to help out G.I. Joe, Barbecue instead stays in Green Ridge to help rebuild it.

Live action film
Barbecue will be appearing in G.I. Joe: Ever Vigilant.

References

External links
 Barbecue at JMM's G.I. Joe Comics Home Page

Fictional axefighters
Fictional characters from Boston
Fictional corporals
Fictional firefighters
Fictional military sergeants
Fictional United States Army personnel
G.I. Joe soldiers
Male characters in animated series
Male characters in comics
Television characters introduced in 1985